František Maxmilián Kaňka (9 August 1674 in Prague – 14 July 1766 in Prague) was a Czech architect and builder. He was known for modifying castles, palaces and churches. In 1724 he was appointed emperor's architect.

Work
He is most famous for reconstructions of palaces and castles of Bohemian noblemen and for designs of churches and other religious buildings, principally in Baroque style. His work includes:
 reconstruction of Vrtba palace and Vrtba Garden, Prague
 reconstruction of the Krásný Dvůr Castle, c. 1720
 with Anselmo Lurago, the Astronomical Tower and other structures at the Clementinum, Prague, c. 1720
 reconstruction of facade of the St. Procopius Basilica in Třebíč (a UNESCO World Heritage Site)
 the chateau Konopiště outside of the town of Benešov, last residence of Archduke Franz Ferdinand of Austria and now a museum
 Church of St. John of Nepomuk, Kutná Hora 
 Veltrusy Mansion residence of count Václav Antonín Chotek of Chotkov and Vojnín 
 reconstruction of Karolinum

External links
 1N Biography (in Czech)
 List of his works in Prague (in Czech)

1674 births
1766 deaths
Czech architects
Architects from Prague